Preston Street railway station (also known as Newtown) was a railway station in Whitehaven, Cumbria, England.

Opened in July 1849 the station was the original terminus in Whitehaven of the Whitehaven & Furness Junction Railway (W&FJ).

A goods connection between the two termini did exist but involved reversing trains and using the numerous goods and colliery lines around Whitehaven harbour and on the streets of Whitehaven.

In 1854 the two companies agreed to pool rolling stock and resources and concentrate all passenger traffic in Whitehaven at Bransty station and all goods traffic at 
Preston Street; this reorganisation started in December 1855 and was noted as complete in February 1856.

This remained the situation until 1969 when with freight revenues declining Preston Street was closed.  In 1972 the site reopened as a coal depot.  By the mid-1990s coal production in the Whitehaven area had ceased and all the pits closed and what traffic there was in coal was transferred to road transport with the final closure of Preston Street.

References

Notes

Sources
 
 
 

Former Furness Railway stations
Railway stations in Great Britain opened in 1849
Railway stations in Great Britain closed in 1969
Disused railway stations in Cumbria